Greg Jamison is an American politician. He has served as a Republican member for the 12th district in the South Dakota House of Representatives since 2021.

Election history

2020     Jamison was elected with 6,799 votes; Rep. Arch Beal was also re-elected with 5,621 votes and Erin Royer received 5,555 votes.

References

External links

Living people
Republican Party members of the South Dakota House of Representatives
21st-century American politicians
Year of birth missing (living people)